The Ramnathi temple is located in Ramnathim, Bandivade in Goa. Goud Saraswat Brahmins (G.S.B) community (belonging to Gokarn Math, & Kashi Mutt), Daivadnya Brahmin and vaishyas are primary worshippers. Similar to other Goan Brahmin temples, Ramnathi too incorporates the system of Panchayatan, therefore, this temple houses 5 main deities namely - Shri Ramanath (chief deity), Shanteri, Kamakshi, Laxmi Narayan, Ganapati, Betal and Kalbhairav, along with other family purushas.

Legend 
Local Hindus believe the Ramanath idol to have originally been installed by Rama at Rameshwar. When Rama came back from Lanka along with Sita, after killing Ravana, he decided to pray to Shiva in order to absolve him of killing a Brahmin. Hence, a lingam was installed, and Rama prayed to it. Shiva is regarded to have emerged from the idol and sent Rama to Guru Gorakshnath. There are 12 Panths, and one of the Panth started from Rama. This came to be known as Ramnath.

History
The original temple of Ramnathi in Goa, was located in Loutolim in salcette (सष्टी), Goa. The Idol of Ramnathi was shifted to the present site in the 16th century to prevent its destruction by the then Portuguese authorities. In May 2011, the Ramnathi temple completed 450 years at its present location.

Deities

The chief deity of the temple is Ramnath. Since Ramnath is the chief deity, the temple came to be known as Ramnathi. The name Ram-Nath equals Lord of Rama i.e. Shiva. In addition the temple has the idols of the Goddess Shanteri (Shantadurga) from Rivona and the Goddess Kamakshi from Loutolim. There is an idol of Shree Lakshmi Narayan Shree Siddhinath (Ganesh), Shree Betal and Shree Kaalbhairav. This completes the Ramnathi Panchayatna.

Kulavis
The kulavis or associated families had migrated out of Salsette due to religious persecution and now dwell all along the western coast of India. A large number of the kulavis live in Goa, Mumbai, coastal Karnataka, Kerala and abroad. The tradition of coming to the temple after a major family event continues.

The kulavis mainly come from Vatsa, KaundinyaGotra of Madhwa follower Gaud Saraswat Brahmins  and of Daivadnya Brahmins samaj.

External links

 http://arunshanbhag.com/2005/03/29/ramnathi-devasthan/
The Ramanthi Temple is also visited by Gowd Saraswat Brahmins of other Gotras also.

References

Shiva temples in Goa
Hindu temples in South Goa district